Ciriaco Baronda (born 3 April 1934) is a Filipino athlete. He competed in the men's high jump at the 1956 Summer Olympics.

References

1934 births
Living people
Athletes (track and field) at the 1956 Summer Olympics
Filipino male high jumpers
Olympic track and field athletes of the Philippines
Place of birth missing (living people)
Asian Games medalists in athletics (track and field)
Asian Games bronze medalists for the Philippines
Athletes (track and field) at the 1962 Asian Games
Medalists at the 1962 Asian Games
20th-century Filipino people